HMS Hermione was a  light cruiser of the Royal Navy. She was built by Alexander Stephen and Sons, (Glasgow, Scotland), with the keel laid down on 6 October 1937. She was launched on 18 May 1939 and commissioned 25 March 1941. Eighty-eight crewmembers were killed.

Construction and design
The Dido-class were designed as small cruisers capable of being built quickly and in large numbers to allow a shortfall in numbers of cruisers against the numbers which were required to meet the Royal Navy's requirements. Rather than the mixed armament of single purpose 6-inch (152 mm) low-angle (anti -ship) and 4-inch (102 mm) high-angle (anti-aircraft) guns carried by previous light cruisers, it was decided to fit a dual purpose main armament, capable of both anti-ship and anti-aircraft fire. This used the new 5.25-inch (133 mm) gun as used in the King George V-class battleships.

Hermione was one of two Dido-class cruisers ordered under the 1937 construction programme for the Royal Navy, following on from 5 ships ordered the previous year. Hermione was laid down at Alexander Stephen and Sons Linthouse, Glasgow shipyard as Yard number 560 on 6 October 1937, was launched on 18 May 1939 and completed on 25 March 1941.

Displacement was  standard and  full load.

The ship's main armament consisted of ten 5.25-inch guns in five twin turrets on the ship's centreline, with three forward and two aft. Two quadruple 2-pounder (40 mm) pom-pom mounts were mounted on the ship's beams to provide close-in anti-aircraft protection, backed up by two quadruple .50 in (12.7 mm) machine guns on the bridge wings. Two triple 21-inch (533 mm) torpedo tubes provided additional anti-ship capability. Fire control for this armament was provided by a single low angle director control tower (DCT) on the ship's bridge, together with two High Angle Control System (HACS) director towers, one on the ship's bridge and one aft. A  armour belt protected the ship's machinery and magazines with  protecting the ship's shell rooms. The 5.25 inch gun turrets had armour of  thickness.

Modifications

While several of the Dido-class were completed with reduced main armaments owing to production problems (the King George V-class battleships had priority for the new guns), Hermione was completed with the full ten-gun outfit. In October–November 1941, the ship's .50 in machine guns were replaced by five single Oerlikon 20 mm cannon.

History

After commissioning and workup, Hermione joined the 15th Cruiser Squadron of the Home Fleet. Hermione left Scapa Flow on 22 May as part of a force including the battleship  and the aircraft carrier . The attack by Victoriouss Swordfish torpedo bombers resulted in a single torpedo hit on Bismarck which did little damage to the German ship. On 25 May, Hermione, short of fuel, was detached from the chase in order to refuel at Iceland. Following the sinking of Bismarck, the British launched a major operation against German supply ships in the Atlantic which supported the operations of surface raiders, with Hermione taking part in searches for these supply ships and German blockade runners before joining Force H, based at Gibraltar on 22 June.
Hermione was then deployed to the Mediterranean.  On 2 August 1941, whilst helping to protect a convoy, Hermione attacked by ramming the Italian submarine Tembien, sinking her; an action commemorated in a propaganda painting by artist Marcus Stone.

Fate 
While under Captain G.N. Oliver, DSO, RN, Hermione was part of the Force A group which escorted convoy MW-11, a supply convoy under Rear Admiral Philip Vian from Alexandria to Malta in Operation Vigorous.

At 23:20 hours on 15 June, U-205 spotted a group of warships north of Sollum and attacked two destroyers with one G7e torpedo each at 23:38 and 23:40 hours, but missed both. Only then did U-205 recognize one of the shadows as a cruiser and fired a spread of three torpedoes at 00:19 hours, hitting Hermione on the starboard side. The ship immediately settled by the stern with a list of 22° before ultimately capsizing, remaining afloat for 21 minutes before sinking. Eight officers and 80 ratings were lost. The survivors were picked up by the escorting destroyers and were landed at Alexandria.

Notes

References

Publications

External links

 WWII cruisers
 HMS Hermione at Uboat.net

 

Dido-class cruisers
Ships built on the River Clyde
1939 ships
World War II cruisers of the United Kingdom
Ships sunk by German submarines in World War II
World War II shipwrecks in the Mediterranean Sea
Maritime incidents in June 1942